Haritina Evstafievna Korotkevich (also romanised as Charitina Korotkiewicz and Haritena Korotkiewich; née Verkhozina) was a soldier who served in the Imperial Russian Army during the Russo-Japanese War. Volunteering to serve disguised as a man under the pseudonym Khariton Korotkevich, she soon gained a reputation as a fearless leader as a woman in her own right. She was killed by shellfire on the front line during the Siege of Port Arthur.

Early life
Haritina Verkhozina was born of humble origins in the village of Nesterevaya in the Tobolsk Governorate, the daughter of peasants.  She lost her mother at the age of six and, at the age of ten, left home to work, finding employment as a dishwasher at Vargashi station. It was there that she met Jakoff Korotkevich, with whom she fell in love and soon after married.

When her husband was called up at the start of the Russo-Japanese War, she initially remained at home, but soon afterwards decided to travel to Port Arthur to be with her husband, despite the perils that the journey held. She disguised herself as a man and worked as a brakeman on the Trans-Siberian Railway, travelling across the Chinese Eastern Railway to Harbin. Arriving in Dalian Bay, she met some soldiers attached to the same company as her husband and changed to women's clothes. Aiming to continue her journey, she was thwarted by the police who threatened to return her to Harbin. However, when she related her story with the officer responsible, he became sympathetic and together they hatched a plan for her to get the lines and be with her husband. She would enlist.

Thus it was. As a contemporary source said, "she took the oath of fidelity, donned her uniform, shouldered her rifle and became a man amongst men, all for Jakoff's sake." She was to become a Russian Joan of Arc for love.

Service in the war

Adopting the masculine name Khariton, Korotkevich was initially not taken seriously, but soon proved to be an able fighter. Joining the 15th Regiment under Captain Gusakovsky, she was a charismatic leader, often leading her troop with courage and skill. In one bayonet charge, it is claimed she killed one Japanese soldier with her bayonet and wounded another with a bullet. She also showed compassion. A story is told of one time, while fighting, a Japanese soldier fell wounded beside her. She instantly dropped her rifle to care for him until the stretcher-bearers arrived. In addition, she also kept morale high among the troops, helping the men by mending clothes and, when she had leave, shopping for soap and tobacco for them.

On , in fierce combat, Jakoff was wounded and Korotkevich accompanied him to a field hospital. She stayed with him for three weeks and only when he was out of immediate danger did she return to her unit. When she did so, she was appointed a messenger by Gusakovsky. In this capacity, she served bravely carrying critical instructions between the commander and the front line in conditions of huge risk to her life. It was during one of these missions that she tragically lost her life.

Death and legacy
On , the Japanese launched a massive offensive against the Russian troops. After the attack was repulsed, Gusakovsky drew up a list of requisitions, including a report of losses and a request for reserves and ammunition. He gave this to Korotkevich to take to regimental headquarters. Unfortunately, just as she was leaving the dugout, a  shell fired by a Japanese  howitzer landed on the emplacement. Korotkevich was killed instantly.

Korotkevich was buried in a mass grave alongside eight others who died at the same time. On her grave was placed a wooden cross and the inscription, "Private Haritina Korotkevich, the bravest of Russian women, who fell fighting for her Czar and her country." She was awarded the Cross of St. George, one of four women to be awarded the honour during the war and the only one posthumously.

See also
 Casta Álvarez
 Agustina de Aragón
 Madeleine de Verchères

References

1882 births
1904 deaths
Recipients of the Cross of St. George
Women in 20th-century warfare
Women in the Imperial Russian military